Kevin McCormick may refer to:

 Kevin McCormick (South Park), minor fictional character on the animated TV series South Park
 Kevin McCormick (producer), American film executive, credits include Burglar
 Kevin McCormick (educator) (born 1965), president and vice-chancellor of Huntington University, Ontario, Canada
 Kevin McCormick (comic artist), American author of the 1980s comic strip Arnold
 Kevin McCormick (music producer), American producer of several albums including Melissa Etheridge
 Kevin McCormick, Libertarian candidate for governor of Arizona, 2018